Dmitry Pavlovich Kostomarov (March 23, 1929 – August 9, 2014) was a Soviet and Russian mathematician, academician of the Russian Academy of Sciences, dean of the Faculty of Computational Mathematics and Cybernetics at Moscow State University (1990—1999), Professor, Dr.Sc.

Biography 
Born into the family of an engineer, a representative of the noble family of the Kostomarovs.

In 1947 he entered the Faculty of Engineering and Physics of the Moscow Mechanical Institute. In 1948 he transferred to the Faculty of Physics of Moscow State University, which he graduated with honors in 1952.

From 1952 to 1955 he studied in the graduate school of the Faculty of Physics at the Department of Mathematics, where the scientific leaders were Yury Rabinovich and Alexander Samarskii. In 1956 he defended his thesis for the degree of Candidate of Physical and Mathematical Sciences, the thesis entitled «On the asymptotic behavior of solutions of systems of linear differential equations in the neighborhood of an irregular singular point».

From 1955 he taught at the Moscow State University, assistant professor of mathematics at the Faculty of Physics (1955-1961), assistant professor (1961—1971). Since 1971 — at the faculty of the Faculty of the CMC of Moscow State University, associate professor of the department of computational mathematics (1971—1972). Doctor of Physical and Mathematical Sciences (1968), thesis: «Electromagnetic Waves in Plasma», since 1972 — Professor of the Faculty of the Faculty of the CMC, Head of the Department of Automation of Scientific Research of the Faculty of the CMC (since 1988). Dean of the Faculty of Computational Mathematics and Cybernetics (1990—1999).

Scientific interests
Fundamental results in the field of mathematical modeling in plasma physics, electrodynamics, nuclear physics.

Main scientific publications
He is the author of 10 monographs and more than 137 research papers.

Awards and honours
  for achievements in the field of science (1976)
  (1980)
 USSR State Prize (1981)
 Order of the Red Banner of Labour (1990)
  for pedagogical activity (1996)
 Order of Honour (1999)
 Order of Friendship (2005)

References

Bibliography

External links
 Dmitry Kostomarov on the website Russian Academy of Sciences 
 Dmitry Kostomarov — scientific works on the website Math-Net.Ru 
 Biography of Dmitry Kostomarov on the website of the MSU Faculty of Computational Mathematics and Cybernetics 
 Dmitry Kostomarov — scientific works on the website ISTINA MSU 

1929 births
2014 deaths
20th-century Russian mathematicians
20th-century Russian physicists
21st-century Russian mathematicians
21st-century Russian physicists
Full Members of the Russian Academy of Sciences
Moscow State University alumni
Academic staff of Moscow State University
Recipients of the Order of Honour (Russia)
Recipients of the Order of the Red Banner of Labour
Recipients of the USSR State Prize
Russian computer scientists
Russian mathematicians
Russian physicists
Soviet computer scientists
Soviet mathematicians
Soviet physicists